Rick Rizzs (born November 17, 1953) is an American sportscaster and is the lead radio voice for Major League Baseball's Seattle Mariners.

Early life and career
Rizzs is from Blue Island, Illinois, where he attended Eisenhower High School, and he is a 1975 graduate of Southern Illinois University in Carbondale. From 1975 to 1980, he handled baseball play-by-play duties at the double-A level for Alexandria, Louisiana, Amarillo, Texas and Memphis, Tennessee. He became the sports director at WBNS radio in Columbus, Ohio in 1981, where he called Ohio State football and triple-A baseball for two seasons. He was named the Ohio "Sportscaster of the Year" in 1981 by the Ohio Sportscasters Association.

Seattle Mariners and Detroit Tigers
Beginning in 1983, Rizzs broadcast Mariners games along with Dave Niehaus. In 1992, Rizzs moved to WJR in Detroit as the sports director, and assumed duties as the new radio play-by-play voice of the Detroit Tigers. The previous announcer, Ernie Harwell, who had been with the Tigers since the 1960 season, had been fired in late 1991. Harwell's dismissal was not at all popular with fans; teaming with Bob Rathbun (also in his first year with the team, replacing Paul Carey, who retired) proved difficult and both were let go after the end of the 1994 season. Rizzs returned to Seattle, where he remains to this day. In 2000, Rizzs was named the Chicago-area sportscaster of the year by the Chicago Pitch and Hit Club.

Although he previously broadcast Mariners games on both television and radio, Rizzs was transferred prior to the 2007 season to work exclusively on Mariners radio broadcasts. For the first three innings, he was accompanied by Dave Sims, who was hired prior to the 2007 season, and for the remainder of the game he was accompanied by the late Dave Niehaus (as Sims and Niehaus switched positions after the third inning). Rizzs did play-by-play for the first three and one-half innings, and again in the 7th inning. In games that went to extra innings, Rizzs did the play-by-play for the even-numbered innings.

With the death of Niehaus on November 10, 2010, Rizzs became the Mariners lead radio voice.

During the 2011-2012 seasons, Rizzs did broadcasts of Mariners baseball with a rotation of guest color commentators, including former Mariners Dan Wilson and Jay Buhner, and former Mariners announcers Ron Fairly, Ken Wilson, Ken Levine, and Dave Valle.

In January 2013, it was announced Rizzs' new radio partner would be Aaron Goldsmith, formerly of the Pawsox Radio Network. His partner Goldsmith does the play-by-play for the 3rd, 6th, and 7th inning, as well as even innings when the game goes into extra innings.

Notable catchphrases
Rizzs is noted for using the following catchphrases on Mariner broadcasts:

"Goodbye baseball!"- used on home run calls.

"Holy smoke(s)!"/"How about that?"- used for exciting plays.

"Get out the rye bread and mustard, Grandma, it is grand salami time! Holy smokes!"- used when the Mariners get a grand slam. Formerly used (except for Holy smokes!) by his longtime radio partner Dave Niehaus.

"Grandma, get out the rye bread and mustard, it is grand salami time!"- alternative grand slam call made by Rizzs.

"How about that, buddy?"- also used after a Mariners player hit a grand slam, in honor of his longtime broadcaster partner/friend Dave Niehaus.

"Happy totals"- used during the postgame when the Mariners win the ballgame, now taken over by Aaron Goldsmith. It was originally used by Chicago Cubs broadcasters in the 1970s.

Personal life
Rizzs resides in Issaquah, Washington. He has one son, Nick, two grandsons, Jaxon and Braedon, and one granddaughter, Ryan.

Rizzs also provided the commentary for the 2005 Nintendo GameCube game Nintendo Pennant Chase Baseball, but the game's U.S. release was canceled.

With former Mariner player Dave Henderson, Rizzs co-founded a charity that provides Christmas gifts to children.

References

External links
Seattle Mariners – Broadcasters
 Interview with Rizzs about the 1995 Mariners

1953 births
American sports announcers
College football announcers
Detroit Tigers announcers
Living people
Major League Baseball broadcasters
Minor League Baseball broadcasters
Ohio State Buckeyes football announcers
People from Blue Island, Illinois
People from Issaquah, Washington
Seattle Mariners announcers
Southern Illinois University alumni